Darlington Corners is an unincorporated community in Thronbury and Westtown townships in Chester County, Pennsylvania, United States. Darlington Corners is located at the intersection of U.S. Route 202/U.S. Route 322 and Pennsylvania Route 926 south of West Chester.

References

Unincorporated communities in Chester County, Pennsylvania
Unincorporated communities in Pennsylvania